Dragan Marušič (born 1953, Koper, Slovenia) is a Slovene mathematician. Marušič obtained his BSc in technical mathematics from the University of Ljubljana in 1976, and his PhD from the University of Reading in 1981 under the supervision of Crispin Nash-Williams.

Marušič has published extensively, and has supervised seven PhD students (as of 2013). He served as the third rector of the University of Primorska from 2011-2019, a university he lobbied to have established in his home town of Koper. His research focuses on topics in algebraic graph theory, particularly the symmetry of graphs and the action of finite groups on combinatorial objects. He is regarded as the founder of the Slovenian school of research in algebraic graph theory and permutation groups.

Education and career
From 1968 to 1972 Marušič attended gymnasium in Koper. He studied undergraduate mathematics at the University of Ljubljana, graduating in 1976. He completed his PhD in 1981 in England, at the University of Reading under the supervision of Crispin Nash-Williams.

After completing a post-doctoral fellowship at the University of Reading in 1983, Marušič spent a year teaching high school mathematics in Koper.  He worked for one year at the University of Minnesota Duluth as an assistant professor, and then spent three years at the University of California, Santa Cruz, from 1985-1988.  In 1988, he returned to Slovenia to work at the University of Ljubljana, where he rose quickly through the ranks, becoming a full professor in 1994. He also held the post of vice-rector of student affairs there from 1989-1991. In 1991-92 he spent a year as a Fulbright scholar at the University of California, Santa Cruz.

Marušič maintains his post at the University of Ljubljana, although he has also held an appointment at the University of Primorska since 2004, shortly after its founding. He has increasingly devoted his time to the newer university, where he established the Faculty of Mathematics, Natural Sciences, and Information Technologies (UP FAMNIT). He served as the dean of that faculty from 2007-2011.  He was elected in 2011 as the third rector of the University of Primorska, a position which he held until 2019.

Marušič has supervised seven PhD students, and has supervised or co-supervised six post-doctoral fellows, in addition to numerous master's and honours students.
He is one of the two founding editors and editors-in-chief (with Tomaž Pisanski) of the journal Ars Mathematica Contemporanea.

Achievements and honours

Marušič is regarded as the founder of the Slovenian school of research in algebraic graph theory and permutation groups.

In 2002 he received the Zois Award, the highest scientific award in Slovenia, for his achievements in the field of graph theory and algebra. Since 2010, he has been a member of the committee that selects the Zois Award recipients, as well as the recipients of other scientific honours from the government of Slovenia.

Research

In his research, Marušič has focused on the actions of permutation groups on graphs. Some of his major contributions have been on the topics of the existence of semiregular automorphisms (see group action for an explanation of this) of vertex-transitive graphs, the existence of Hamiltonian paths and cycles in vertex-transitive graphs, and the structures of semi-symmetric graphs and half-transitive graphs. With co-authors, he proved that the Gray graph on 54 vertices is the smallest cubic semi-symmetric graph.

He has well over 100 publications.

Personal life
Marušič is married and has two sons.  His brother, Dorijan Marušič was the Minister of Health for Slovenia.

External links

Selected publications

References

1953 births
Living people
Graph theorists
Alumni of the University of Reading
20th-century Slovenian mathematicians
21st-century Slovenian mathematicians
Academic staff of the University of Primorska
People from Koper
Academic staff of the University of Ljubljana
University of Ljubljana alumni
Yugoslav mathematicians